Tu Tevha Tashi is an Indian Marathi language drama television series directed by Mandar Devasthali. It is airing on Zee Marathi television channel from Monday to Saturday. It stars Swapnil Joshi, and Shilpa Tulaskar in lead roles with Abhidnya Bhave, Suhas Joshi in supporting roles.

Plot 
Anamika Dixit is a self-employed businesswoman and Saurabh Patwardhan is a job seeker. Anamika is separated from her husband and lives with her mother-in-law Rama Joshi and daughter Radha Dixit whereas Saurabh lives with his brother Sachin, sister-in-law Pushpavalli, and aunt Kunda Maimavshi. As Sachin is unemployed, Pushpavalli and her father Appa are always robbing Saurabh by putting on acts while Radha is proud of money. 

Saurabh and Anamika, friends in college, meet after several years due to their friend Chandu Chimane. Saurabh loves Anamika but has promised his late parents that he will not get married unless Sachin stands on his own feet. Pushpavalli does not want him to marry her because she thinks that if Anamika comes to their house, she will be the owner of it. Maimavshi has a mouthful but she loves Saurabh as her own son and wants him to marry Anamika. However, things take a turn when Anamika's mother Kaveri Dixit arrives in town and decides to separate her from Saurabh.

Cast

Main 
 Swapnil Joshi as Saurabh Vishnupant Patwardhan; Anamika's love interest, Sachin's brother, Valli's brother-in-law, Maimavshi's nephew and Chandu's friend
 Shilpa Tulaskar as Anamika Dixit / Anamika Akash Joshi; Saurabh's love interest, Radha's mother, Akash's wife, Rama's daughter-in-law and Kaveri's daughter

Recurring 
Saurabh's family
 Abhidnya Bhave as Pushpavalli Moropant Eadke / Pushpavalli Sachin Patwardhan (Valli); Sachin's wife, Saurabh's sister-in-law, Maimavshi's niece-in-law and Appa's daughter
 Abhishek Rahalkar as Sachin Vishnupant Patwardhan; Saurabh's brother, Valli's husband, Maimavshi's nephew and Appa's son-in-law
 Sunil Godbole as Moropant Edake (Appa); Valli's father and Sachin's father-in-law
 Ujjwala Jog as Kunda Ranade (Maimavshi); Saurabh and Sachin's aunt

Anamika's family
 Suhas Joshi as Rama Joshi; Anamika's mother-in-law, Akash's mother, Radha's paternal grandmother
 Ashok Samarth as Akash Joshi; Anamika's husband, Rama's son, Radha's father, Kaveri's son-in-law
 Roomani Khare as Radha Akash Joshi; Akash and Anamika's daughter, Rama's paternal granddaughter, Kaveri's maternal granddaughter, Hiten's friend
 Rama Nadgauda as Kaveri Dixit; Anamika's mother, Radha's maternal grandmother

Others 
 Swanand Ketkar as Neel; Anamika's employee
 Kiran Bhalerao as Chandu Chimane; Saurabh's friend
 Disha Danade as Mrs. Chimane; Chandu's wife
 Bhagya Nair as Riya Nair; Sachin's boss
 Meera Welankar as Chitralekha; Anamika's friend
 Vikas Verma as Hiten; Radha's friend
 Hitesh Sampat as Champak; Hiten's father

Production

Development 
Mandar Devasthali, who directs the series for Zee Marathi stating, "We always try to do something new. Many ongoing love stories may have been told, but the story of the remaining love may have come, but we tell it in a new way. That's what makes this series so different. I am sure that the audience will also like the story of this series."

Casting 
Swapnil Joshi was selected for the role of Saurabh Patwardhan. Shilpa Tulaskar selected for the role of Anamika Dixit. Roomani Khare daughter of Sandeep Khare debut with this series. Abhidnya Bhave comeback with the role of Pushpavalli.

Filming 
The series filmed mainly in Pune. Their particular spot on JM Road, Bal Gandharva Ranga Mandir, Chhatrapati Sambhajiraje Udyan.

Reception

Special episode

1 hour 
 20 March 2022
 10 April 2022
 17 April 2022
 19 June 2022
 31 July 2022
 14 August 2022
 26 March 2023

2 hours 
 6 November 2022 (Akash-Anamika's marriage)

Airing history

Awards

References

External links 
 
 Tu Tevha Tashi at ZEE5

Marathi-language television shows
2022 Indian television series debuts
Zee Marathi original programming
2023 Indian television series endings